Zarow is a river in Western Pomerania, Mecklenburg-Vorpommern, Germany.

Zarow may also refer to:
 Żarów, Lower Silesian Voivodeship (south-western Poland)
 Żarów, Opole Voivodeship (south-western Poland)